Musa Khan Mosque is one of the few Mughal structures on Bangladesh that stands in the southern part of the country's capital Dhaka. Built in 18th century the mosque holds significant historical values and is named after the son of medieval Bengal's one of the most prominent Baro-Bhuyans, Isa Khan's son Musa Khan. The structure was erected during the Mughal regime in Bengal by the grandson of Musa Khan, Diwan Munawar Khan.

The three-domed mosque is currently situated in the University of Dhaka campus, beside Shahidullah Hall and behind the Curzon Hall. The mosque is now under significant threat due to a metro-rail project of the government of Bangladesh and is included in the list of 75 structures that may face serious consequences due to the metro-rail.

Background
The land of Bengal in medieval age was used to be ruled by approximately twelve landlords who were popularly known as Baro-Bhuyan in the history. Baro-Bhuyans were led by Isa Khan, a Muslim Rajput commander who conducted a series of successful military campaigns and successfully resisted the Mughal invasion in Bengal till his death. His capital was situated in Sonargaon of Narayanganj District.

After his death in 1599, his son Musa Khan took over the control and continued his father's legacy to fight Mughals in the western and northern fronts but was eventually defeated by Mughal general Islam Khan I, and later became loyal to Mughals and served the Mughal army during the Tripura campaign. Musa Khan died a natural death in 1623 and was buried in Dhaka.

His grandson, Diwan Munawar Khan, in remembrance of his grandfather built a mosque beside Musa Khan's grave.

Architecture

The mosque has three domes and it built on a vaulted platform of around 3 meters height. The width of the platform varies from 17 meters to 14 meters. Under the platform there are series of rooms which are now badly damaged.

The top of the stage can be reached by an extended staircase on the southwestern corner. The mosque proper occupies the western half of the platform. The four octagonal corner towers with extra towers by their sides rise above the flat fortifications and end in compact cabins with domes on the top.

Threat
The Mughal structure, which is one of the rarest one of the country is under threat due to a metro-rail project adjacent to it. The structure is among 75 structures with historical importance that has fallen under threat due to the project.

Gallery

See also
 List of mosques in Bangladesh
 List of archaeological sites in Bangladesh

References

Mosques in Dhaka